The Maranoa colonial by-election, 1864 was a by-election held on 27 September 1864 in the electoral district of Maranoa for the Queensland Legislative Assembly.

History
On 28 July 1864, William Kennedy, the member for Maranoa, was unseated by the Elections and Qualifications Committee. William Miles won the resulting by-election on 27 September 1864.

See also
 Members of the Queensland Legislative Assembly, 1863–1867

References

1864 elections in Australia
Queensland state by-elections
1860s in Queensland